General Heath may refer to:

Charles Ernest Heath (1854–1936), British Army major general
Henry Heath (British Army officer) (1860–1915), British Army major general
Lewis Heath (1885–1954), British Indian Army lieutenant general
William Heath (1737–1814), Continental Army  major general

See also
Frederick Heath-Caldwell (1858–1945), British Army major general